Omladinski košarkaški klub Vrbas, commonly referred to as OKK Vrbas or KK Vrbas, is a men's basketball club based in Vrbas, Serbia. They are currently competing in the Second Basketball League of Serbia.

History 
The club finished at the top spot in the 2019–20 season with a 17–1 record prior the cancellation of the season. After the abandoned season, the club got promoted to the Second Basketball League of Serbia for the 2020–21 season.

Players

Head coaches 
  Veselin Čolaković (2017–2018)
  Vuk Peković (2017–2018)
  Bojan Marković (2019–2020)
  Petar Bodrožić (2020–2021)
  Bojan Marković (2021–present)

Trophies and awards

Trophies
 First Regional League, North Division (3rd-tier)
 Winners (1): 2017–18

Individual awards 
 Second Men's League of Serbia scoring leader (1):
 Ivan Đurović — 2018–19

References

External links
 Profile at srbijasport.net 
 Profile at eurobasket.com

Fair Play
Fair Play
Fair Play
Sport in Vrbas, Serbia